Metamesia physetopa is a species of moth of the family Tortricidae. It is found in Ethiopia and Uganda.

References

	

Moths described in 1932
Archipini